The Saar-Hunsrück Nature Park was established in 1980 and covers an area of just under 2,000 km² in the German states of Rhineland-Palatinate and the Saarland.

The authority responsible for the nature park is the Saar-Hunsrück Nature Park Society (Verein Naturpark Saar-Hunsrück) with its headquarters in Hermeskeil. In Hermeskeil the society runs an "experience museum" and one of six information centres.

Towns and villages 
In the Saarland, the nature park lies wholly within the town boroughs and local municipalities of Perl, Mettlach, Losheim am See, Merzig, Weiskirchen, Wadern, Beckingen, Rehlingen-Siersburg, Wallerfangen, Nonnweiler, Tholey, Nohfelden, Oberthal, Namborn, St. Wendel and Freisen. It also lies partly on the territories of Lebach, in its municipalities of Dörsdorf and Steinbach, the municipality of Schmelz, in its parishes of Dorf, Limbach and Michelbach and within the municipality of Eppelborn, in the parish of Dirmingen.

In Rhineland-Palatinate the nature park lies on parts of the territories of the following boroughs and collective municipalities: Saarburg, Konz, Ruwer, Kell am See, Hermeskeil (Trier-Saarburg), Thalfang, Bernkastel-Kues (Bernkastel-Wittlich), Kirchberg/Hunsrück (Rhein-Hunsrück-Kreis), Herrstein-Rhaunen, Birkenfeld and Baumholder (Birkenfeld) and parts of the free municipality of Morbach (Landkreis Bernkastel-Wittlich) and the large county town of Idar-Oberstein (Birkenfeld).

Core zones 
There are seven core zones in the Rhineland –Palatinate part of the park, which are specially protected:
 Mannebach Valley
 Saar Valley-Leukbach Valley
 Osburger Hochwald
 Western part of the Schwarzwälder Hochwald
 Eastern part of the Schwarzwälder Hochwald-Idar Forest
 Neuhof-Abentheuer
 Southeastern Hochwald Kirschweiler/Buhlenberg

Rivers and streams

Mountains and hills 
The mountains and hills in the Saar-Hunsrück Nature Park include the following – sorted by height in metres (m) above sea level (Normalnull or NN; unless otherwise stated these are referenced from state map service):
 Erbeskopf (816.32 m), Schwarzwälder Hochwald
 An den zwei Steinen (766.2 m), Idar Forest
 Kahlheid (766.0 m), Idar Forest
 Sandkopf (756.8 m), Schwarzwälder Hochwald
 Steingerüttelkopf (756.6 m), Idarwald
 Ruppelstein (755.2 m), Schwarzwälder Hochwald
 Idarkopf (745.7 m), Idar Forest
 Usarkopf (725.0 m), Idar Forest
 Rösterkopf (708.1 m), Osburger Hochwald
 Friedrichskopf (707.4 m), Schwarzwälder Hochwald

Saar-Hunsrück-Steig 
One of the nature park's projects is the 218-kilometre-long "premier" long-distance path, the Saar-Hunsrück-Steig from Perl on the border with Luxembourg via Mettlach, Weiskirchen and the Roman city of Trier to the Prims Reservoir, continuing via the Erbeskopf, the circular rampart of Otzenhausen, to the  Wildenburger Kopf and finally to Idar-Oberstein.

See also 
 List of nature parks in Germany

Literature 
 Hans-Martin Braun and Carsten Braun: Saar-Hunsrück Nature Park - Stille Schönheit. Tecklenborg Verlag, Steinfurt, 2002,

External links 

Saar-Hunsrück Nature Park, Hermeskeil
 Literature about the Saar-Hunsrück Nature Park in the Saarländische Bibliographie

References 

Nature parks in Rhineland-Palatinate
Geography of the Hunsrück
Protected areas established in 1980
1980 establishments in West Germany